Mark Suresh Joshi (2 March 1969 – 8 October 2017) was a researcher and consultant in mathematical finance, and a professor at the University of Melbourne.  His research focused on derivatives pricing and interest rate derivatives in particular. He is the author of numerous research articles and seven books; his popular guides, "On becoming a quant" and "How to Get a Quant Job in Finance", are widely read.

He was an assistant lecturer in the department of pure mathematics and mathematical statistics at Cambridge University and a fellow of Darwin College from 1994 to 1999. Following this, he worked for the Royal Bank of Scotland from 1999 to 2005 as a quantitative analyst at a variety of levels, finishing as the Head of Quantitative Research for Group Risk Management. He joined the Centre for Actuarial Studies at the University of Melbourne in November 2005 as an associate professor, and was subsequently promoted to full professor. He taught the subject Financial Mathematics III and was also a highly sought after honours supervisor in the department.

Mark Joshi wrote numerous research articles on quantitative finance, and also authored several books:
four on mathematical finance
 The Concepts and Practice of Mathematical Finance, 2003, second edition 2008
 C++ Design Patterns and Derivatives Pricing, 2004, second edition 2008
 More Mathematical Finance (published in September 2011)
 Introduction to mathematical portfolio theory (published in July 2013).
one on the quantitative finance job interview:
 Quant Job Interview Questions And Answers, 2008, second edition 2013
 two on Mathematics:
 Introduction to the Theory of Distributions (with F. G. Friedlander).
 Proof Patterns, 2015

He obtained a B.A. in mathematics  from Hertford College, University of Oxford in 1990 (Top of year; recipient of the Oxford University Prize in Mathematics ), and a Ph.D. in pure mathematics from the Massachusetts Institute of Technology in 1994 under the supervision of Richard Melrose.

References

External links
 Personal page - no longer available
 University of Melbourne page
 SSRN Author Page

1969 births
2017 deaths
British consultants
Alumni of Hertford College, Oxford
Massachusetts Institute of Technology School of Science alumni
Academic staff of the University of Melbourne
Fellows of Darwin College, Cambridge
Financial economists